Terry Kenneth Carkner (born March 7, 1966) is a Canadian former professional ice hockey defenceman who played 13 seasons in the National Hockey League (NHL) with the New York Rangers, Quebec Nordiques, Philadelphia Flyers, Detroit Red Wings and Florida Panthers. He was selected fourteenth overall in the 1984 NHL Entry Draft. Carkner was born in Smith Falls, Ontario, but grew up in Winchester, Ontario. Carkner was a fearless, tough defensive defenseman. He got over 100 penalty minutes 8 times in his NHL career.

Carkner was the head coach of the club ice hockey team for Villanova University, the Icecats, for the 2004–05 season. The Villanova team is a member of the ACHA (American Collegiate Hockey Association) Division 1 and the ECHA (Eastern Collegiate Hockey Association). He is currently (09–10) an assistant coach for the Great Valley Ice Hockey Varsity Team.  

Carkner is an honorary member of the Nordmont (Pennsylvania) Sport & Social Club.

Playing career
Carkner played major-junior for the Peterborough Petes, an Ontario Hockey League team based in Peterborough, Ontario. He played 184 games for that club, amassing 130 points (0.71 points per game) and 322 penalty minutes. He would also play for team Canada in the 1986 World Junior Hockey Championships, where he won a silver medal.

In the 1984 NHL Entry Draft, Carkner was chosen 14th overall by the New York Rangers. In that draft, the NHL Central Scouting bureau ranked him as the 17th best prospect, while the Hockey News ranked him 11th.

He would play one season with the Rangers, sharing time between them and the New Haven Nighthawks, their AHL affiliate. Before the start of the 1987–88 season, he was traded to the Quebec Nordiques with Jeff Jackson for John Ogrodnick and David Shaw.

Carkner would play the entire 1987–88 season for Quebec, getting 27 points and 159 penalty minutes in 63 games. Once again, before the start of the next season, he was traded to the Philadelphia Flyers for Greg Smyth and a draft pick.

With the Flyers, Carkner would play 5 seasons, getting 376 games, 132 points (0.35 points per game), and 867 penalty minutes. In 1989, the Flyers named him an alternate captain. He was later traded to the Detroit Red Wings for Yves Racine and a draft pick. After playing two years in Detroit, he signed as a free agent for the Florida Panthers on a two-year, 1.2 million dollar deal. He would finish his NHL career in Florida after four seasons with the Panthers.

In total, Carkner played 858 games in the NHL, amassing 230 points (0,27 points per game) and 1588 penalty minutes.

Personal
Carkner's father, Robert Carkner, was a major junior hockey player in his youth. He is a third cousin of former NHL defenceman Matt Carkner. He is also active with the hockey club ShinnyUSA.(Rink 4)

Career statistics

Regular season and playoffs

International

Awards and honours

References

External links
 

1966 births
Living people
Canadian ice hockey defencemen
Detroit Red Wings players
Florida Panthers players
Ice hockey people from Ontario
National Hockey League first-round draft picks
New Haven Nighthawks players
New York Rangers draft picks
New York Rangers players
People from Smiths Falls
People from the United Counties of Stormont, Dundas and Glengarry
Peterborough Petes (ice hockey) players
Philadelphia Flyers players
Quebec Nordiques players